Thomas Hugh Armstrong (21 April 1849 – 27 January 1929) was an English cricketer. 

The son of William Armstrong of Wingate, County Durham, a mining engineer, he was educated at Rossall School and at St John's College, Oxford, matriculating in 1868. 

He played one first-class match for Oxford University Cricket Club in 1869. Below first-class, he had appeared in one county match, for Shropshire in 1868.

He passed the final law examination in 1875. He was in a partnership with Arthur Fell, as solicitors; it was dissolved in 1897. He died at Leigh Hall, East Grinstead in 1929.

See also
 List of Oxford University Cricket Club players

References

External links
 

1849 births
1929 deaths
English cricketers
Oxford University cricketers
Cricketers from County Durham
Alumni of St John's College, Oxford
People from Wingate, County Durham